Barnsley is an unincorporated community in Hopkins County, in the U.S. state of Kentucky.

History
Barnsley had its start in 1886 as a mining community. A post office was established at Barnsley in 1888, and remained in operation until 1928.

On December 10, 2021, a violent tornado tore through Barnsley, destroying 25 to 30 homes.

References

Unincorporated communities in Hopkins County, Kentucky
Unincorporated communities in Kentucky